Blackwood Island is part of the Great Barrier Reef Marine Park at the tip of Cape Melville, Queensland in Bathurst Bay.

It is east of Denham Island and south-west of Flinders Island in the Flinders Group National Park. It is around 160 hectares or 1.6 square km in size.

The elevation of the terrain is approximately 73 meters above sea level.

Blackwood Island has a major place in Aboriginal ritual and mythology. Blackwood Island is of mythological significance to Aborigines. It symbolises the dead body of the whale speared by culture heroes Itjibiya and Almbarrin after leaving Bathurst Heads on their way to Clack Island where they now reside.

References

Islands on the Great Barrier Reef
Protected areas of Far North Queensland
Australian Aboriginal art
Uninhabited islands of Australia
Islands of Far North Queensland
Places in the Great Barrier Reef Marine Park